Rory Phillips is a London-based DJ and producer.

Career 
After getting his start playing records at clubs in Newport, Rory moved to London where upon making the acquaintance of Erol Alkan he began a residency at Trash at The End. When Trash finished in 2007, he was the driving force behind its successor, DURRR, which ran until December 2013. He was also a touring member of the electronic rock group Whitey, playing synthesizer and contributing to recordings.

Remixing and Production
Phillips' acclaim as a DJ led to invitations to remix acts including Scissor Sisters, The Gossip, Franz Ferdinand, and White Lies. In 2010 his remix of YACHT's "Psychic City" featured on a commercial for Cadillac and his reworking of The xx was included on the soundtrack of Pro Evolution Soccer 2011. In 2012 he began releasing original material as part of a vinyl subscription series named Mixed Fortunes with a host of collaborators including L-Vis 1990 and Paul Thomson of Franz Ferdinand. In 2013 Rory played material from the series with a live band.

Discography

Original releases

Remixes

References

British DJs
Living people
Year of birth missing (living people)